Molly Beth Lanaghan (born January 29, 1999) is a British-Canadian ice dancer, who currently competes with Dmitre Razgulajevs.

Personal life 
Molly Lanaghan was born on January 29, 1999, in Doncaster, England. She has an older sister named Charlotte. In addition to figure skating, she is also a certified lash technician.

Career

Early career 
Lanaghan began skating in 2007 after watching her older sister skate. At the age of thirteen, Lanaghan began pairs skating for Great Britain with Jake Astill from 2013 to 2015. Together, they won the 2014 British Junior Figure Skating Championships

Following the end of her partnership with Astill, Lanaghan decided to switch to the ice dancing discipline at the suggestion of her pairs coaches. She had a brief partnership with fellow British ice dancer, Joseph Buckland.

Partnership with Razgulajevs 
Lanaghan partnered with Canadian ice dancer Dmitre Razgulajevs. The two decided to compete for Canada. They debuted internationally at the 2017 CS Warsaw Cup, where they placed tenth.  They went on to win a bronze medal at the 2018 Skate Canada Challenge, qualifying them for the 2018 Canadian Championships, where they placed seventh.

Beginning the 2018–19 season, they placed sixth at the 2018 CS Autumn Classic International and repeated as bronze medalists at the 2019 Skate Canada Challenge. The pair placed fifth at the 2020 Canadian Championships. They also placed fifth at the 2020 Bavarian Open.

Lanaghan/Razgulajevs were assigned to make their Grand Prix debut at the 2020 Skate Canada International, but the event was cancelled as a result of the coronavirus pandemic.

2021-22 season 

Lanaghan/Razgulajevs began their season with eleventh and eighth-place finishes at the 2021 CS Cup of Austria and the 2021 CS Warsaw Cup, respectively. They ended their season by finishing eighth at the 2022 Canadian Figure Skating Championships.

2022-23 season 

Lanaghan/Razgulajevs opened their season by finishing fourth at the 2022 CS Nebelhorn Trophy. They then went on to make their Grand Prix debut at the 2022 Grand Prix de France, where they finished in tenth place.

Programs

With Razgulajevs

With Astill

Competitive highlights 
GP: Grand Prix; CS: Challenger Series; JGP: Junior Grand Prix

With Razgulajevs

With Astill

References 

1999 births
Canadian ice dancers
Living people